Lucas de Souza Mombra Rosa (born 20 October 2001), commonly known as Lucas Mezenga, is a Brazilian footballer who plays as a central defender for Botafogo.

Club career
Born in Rio de Janeiro, Lucas Mezenga was a Nova Iguaçu youth graduate. He made his first team debut on 4 July 2020, starting in a 1–1 Campeonato Carioca away draw against America-RJ.

On 7 June 2021, Lucas Mezenga moved on loan to Botafogo on loan, being initially assigned to the under-20 squad. He asked to leave the club in September after having an offer from Emirates Club, but the move was denied in the following month. On 13 December, he still signed a permanent deal with Fogão.

Lucas Mezenga scored his first senior goal on 7 March 2022, netting the second in a 5–0 home routing of Volta Redonda. He made his Série A debut on 17 July, coming on as a second-half substitute for fellow debutant DG in a 1–0 away loss against Atlético Mineiro.

Career statistics

References

External links
Botafogo profile 

2001 births
Living people
Footballers from Rio de Janeiro (city)
Brazilian footballers
Association football defenders
Campeonato Brasileiro Série A players
Campeonato Brasileiro Série B players
Nova Iguaçu Futebol Clube players
Botafogo de Futebol e Regatas players